Tricorythodes is a genus of little stout crawler mayflies in the family Leptohyphidae. There are about 16 described species in Tricorythodes.

Species
 Tricorythodes albilineatus Berner, 1946
 Tricorythodes allectus (Needham, 1905)
 Tricorythodes cobbi Alba-Tercedor and Flannagan, 1995
 Tricorythodes comus Traver, 1959
 Tricorythodes costaricanus (Ulmer, 1920)
 Tricorythodes curvatus Allen, 1977
 Tricorythodes explicatus (Eaton, 1892)
 Tricorythodes fictus Traver, 1935
 Tricorythodes kirki Baumgardner, 2007
 Tricorythodes mosegus Alba-Tercedor and Flannagan, 1995
 Tricorythodes notatus Allen and Brusca, 1973
 Tricorythodes primus Baumgardner, 2007
 Tricorythodes robacki (Allen, 1967)
 Tricorythodes sordidus Allen, 1967
 Tricorythodes stygiatus McDunnough, 1931
 Tricorythodes ulmeri Allen and Brusca, 1973

References

Further reading

 

Mayfly genera